Wade Leon Smith (born April 26, 1981) is a former American football offensive tackle who played twelve seasons in the National Football League (NFL). He played college football for the University of Memphis, and was drafted by the Miami Dolphins in the third round of the 2003 NFL Draft.  Smith has also played for the New York Jets,  Kansas City Chiefs, Houston Texans, Seattle Seahawks, and Philadelphia Eagles.

College career
He was a four-year letterman and two-year starting left tackle as a senior and was named a second-team All-Conference USA selection. He was formerly used at tight end and caught five passes for 25 yards as a sophomore.

Professional career

Smith was ranked fifth among offensive guard prospects and was projected a fourth round in the 2003 NFL Draft.

Houston Texans
In the October 16, 2011 away game match-up between the Texans and Ravens, Smith recovered a loose ball to score the first touchdown scored by an offensive lineman in Texans history.

Smith was selected to the NFL Pro Bowl AFC Team in 2012 for the first time in his career. He joined 8 of his Houston Texans teammates in Hawaii in his debut.

Seattle Seahawks
Smith signed with the Seattle Seahawks on August 4, 2014. The Seahawks released Smith on August 25, 2014.

Philadelphia Eagles
Smith signed with the Philadelphia Eagles on September 9, 2014. He was released on October 14, 2014.

References

External links
 The Wade Smith Foundation

1981 births
Living people
American football centers
American football offensive guards
American football offensive tackles
Houston Texans players
Kansas City Chiefs players
Memphis Tigers football players
Miami Dolphins players
New York Jets players
Philadelphia Eagles players
Seattle Seahawks players
Players of American football from Dallas
American Conference Pro Bowl players